Chenel is a white South African wine grape variety that was produced by a crossing of Chenin blanc and Trebbiano. The variety was produced in the late 20th century for viticultural purposes and its resistance to various grape rots.

See also
Weldra, another white South African grape variety with the same parentage as Chenel

References

White wine grape varieties